Deities & Demigods (abbreviated DDG), alternatively known as Legends & Lore (abbreviated L&L or LL), is a reference book for the Dungeons & Dragons fantasy role-playing game (D&D).  The book provides descriptions and game statistics of gods and legendary creatures from various sources in mythology and fiction, and allows dungeon masters to incorporate aspects of religions and mythos into their D&D campaigns.

The first Deities & Demigods was published in 1980 by TSR, Inc. while another book called Deities and Demigods was published in 2002 by Wizards of the Coast, which acquired the D&D brand with their purchase of TSR in 1998.

The original 1980 edition was the first print appearance of various fictional non-human deities, such as Corellon Larethian, Moradin, Gruumsh, and others, many of which have become standard features of the D&D game and its derivatives.  These deities were the creation of Jim Ward. Later printings of Deities & Demigods, beginning in 1981, removed some material present in the 1980 printings.

Printings

1st Edition Advanced Dungeons & Dragons
TSR published the first version of Deities & Demigods in 1980 as a 144-page hardcover for the first edition Advanced Dungeons & Dragons rules.  This edition, by James M. Ward and Robert J. Kuntz, served to update the material they had earlier included in 1976's Supplement IV: Gods, Demi-Gods & Heroes for the original D&D ruleset. The book presents the game statistics and background information for the gods, heroes, and legendary monsters from different mythologies. The original edition covered 12 pantheons of gods from myth and folklore, plus gods for various nonhumans, and four fictional groups: the Arthurian heroes, Fritz Leiber's "Nehwon mythos", Michael Moorcock's "Melnibonéan mythos", and H. P. Lovecraft's "Cthulhu Mythos". These statistics are presented in a fashion similar to that of the Monster Manual, and the statistics are accompanied by illustrations, as well as a short descriptive piece that details under what circumstances the god will appear, what the god might do if he does appear, and what his responsibilities and penchants may be. The book also details the mythoi of these religions, as well as how their clerics should behave, and describes the known planes of existence and how the afterlife applies to characters. Interior illustrations were submitted by Jeff Dee, Eymoth (Kenneth Rahman), Jennell Jaquays, Dave S. LaForce, Jeff Lanners, Erol Otus, Darlene Pekul, Jim Roslof, David C. Sutherland III, and D.A. Trampier.

The original Deities & Demigods contains 17 categories of mythos for use with AD&D.  The gods' statistics are set up like the monsters in the original Monster Manual.  There is a 9-page clerical chart and a chapter on the known planes of existence.

For the first 1980 printing, TSR obtained permission from Michael Moorcock for inclusion of Melnibonéan material (from his Elric series of books), and from Arkham House, which claimed to hold the copyrights on a number of works by H. P. Lovecraft, for inclusion of characters from the Cthulhu Mythos. However, Arkham House had already licensed the Cthulhu property to the game company Chaosium. Furthermore, Chaosium had also licensed the Melnibonéan copyright from Moorcock. When Chaosium threatened legal action, the first printing was halted and the two companies agreed on a compromise: TSR could continue to use the material but must provide a credit to Chaosium to do so. TSR added the credit for the second printing of the book.

The Cthulhu and Melnibonéan sections were removed from the 1981 edition, making it a 128-page hardcover (and giving the original edition a high collector's value). TSR felt its material should not contain such an overt reference to one of its competitors and removed the two pantheons altogether, thus negating the need for the credit. For this reason, the first and second printings have generally been in greater demand by D&D fans and collectors. The credit to Chaosium and incorrect page and pantheon counts were still included in some of the subsequent printings.

For the 1985 printing, the book was repackaged and its name was changed to Legends & Lore. This sixth printing featured the name change to avoid potential conflicts with fundamentalist Christian groups such as Patricia Pulling's BADD. Despite the name change and new cover artwork (by Jeff Easley), the interior material was nearly identical to the fifth printing.

In 1999, a paperback reprint of the first edition was released.

2nd Edition Advanced Dungeons & Dragons
When the second edition of the Advanced Dungeons & Dragons game was released, a new Legends & Lore was written for it. Cover art is by Jeff Easley, with interior illustrations by George Barr, Terry Dykstra, Erol Otus, Erik Olsen, Jean Elizabeth Martin, Jeff Easley, Carol Heyer, Roger Loveless, John and Laura Lakey, and Keith Parkinson. Legends & Lore was expanded, completely revised from the 1st Edition AD&D volume, and rewritten for the 2nd Edition rules. This edition had pared-down content in comparison to the original; the sections on Babylonian, Finnish, Sumerian and non-humanoid deities were wholly excised. The Central American mythos was renamed the Aztec mythos, while the Nehwon mythos was retained. A separate sourcebook, Monster Mythology, later covered the non-human deities in much greater detail than any previous source, introducing several new deities in the process. Furthermore, the late 2nd Edition Planescape book, On Hallowed Ground, gave a virtually comprehensive look at the various pantheons present in the D&D shared universe up to that point, and a level of detail not since exceeded.

3rd Edition Dungeons & Dragons

For the third edition of Dungeons & Dragons, the name was changed back to Deities & Demigods and the cover artwork was changed again to bring it more in line with other third edition D&D manuals. The interior material bears little resemblance to the previous printings of the book (first through sixth). Additionally, this edition presents only a few historical pantheons and in something of a vacuum, without any reference to or inclusion of their development in previous D&D sources, choosing instead to detail them as one-off campaign options.

The third edition volume was written by Rich Redman, Skip Williams, and James Wyatt. The cover illustration was by Sam Wood, with interior illustrations by Kyle Anderson, Glen Angus, Matt Cavotta, Dennis Cramer, Tony DiTerlizzi, Jeff Easley, Donato Giancola, Lars Grant-West, Rebecca Guay, Matt Mitchell, Eric Peterson, Wayne Reynolds, Darrell Riche, Richard Sardinha, and Brian Snoddy, with Justin Norman, Arnie Swekel, and Sam Wood.

James Wyatt comments on the book's relationship to similar books from earlier editions: "This book owes a lot to the 1st Edition Deities and Demigods/Legends and Lore book, more so than the 2nd Edition version. However, the new material we introduced meant that we had a lot less room to include the variety of pantheons included in the earlier version. So we chose the pantheons that we felt were (a) most popular and (b) most ensconced in the popular culture of fantasy: the Greek, Norse, and Egyptian. It stung a bit to leave out the Celtic deities, but we just didn't have the space."

4th Edition Dungeons & Dragons
Rather than a separate sourcebook, Deities & Demigods is the name of a semi-regular column in Dragon and Dungeon magazines.  Deities & Demigods articles in Dragon offers options for players and tips on roleplaying worshippers of a particular god, while articles in Dungeon offer backstory and monsters that DMs can use in a campaign. Starting with Dragon #380, the column was renamed Channel Divinity, though it continues to appear under its original name in Dungeon.

Artwork
The artwork for the first several printings of this "cyclopedia" was created by artists Jeff Dee, Erol Otus, Eymoth, Darlene Pekul, Jennell Jaquays, Jim Roslof, David S. LaForce, David C. Sutherland III, Jeff Lanners, and David A. Trampier. Each artist usually providing all the artwork for an entire pantheon. Erol Otus produced the cover artwork.

The most recent printings of the book contain illustrations from numerous artists and are more in line with the Wizards of the Coast modern treatment of Dungeons & Dragons. These illustrations are in full color, as compared to the black and white art of the original.

Legal history
Deities & Demigods was one of many items named in a 1992 lawsuit between TSR and Game Designers' Workshop regarding the Dangerous Journeys role-playing game and various rulebooks/sourcebooks designed for that game.  One section of this lawsuit argued that "The Plane of Shadow in MYTHUS (pages 190 and 402) and MYTHUS MAGICK (pages 21–22, ...) is derived from the Plane of Shadow in the AD&D DEITIES & DEMIGODS book (Appendix 1, page 129);  ..."

Reception

1st Edition
Kevin Frey reviewed the supplement in The Space Gamer No. 34. He commented that "If you like a wide variety of deities, this is for you.  The gods range from Greek to Chinese to Newhon." He noted that "The problem with this book is that worshippers' alignments are too restricted.  For example, in the Melnibonean mythos, there are no gods for the alignments of lawful-evil, chaotic-good, lawful-neutral, or neutral-good; the majority were chaotic-evil.  What good is a godless lawful-evil cleric?" Frey concluded his review by saying, "On the whole, it's worth [the price]. Any AD&D DM should get this book."

The original Deities & Demigods was reviewed by Andy Slack in issue #23 of the magazine White Dwarf (February/March 1981), who gave the book a rating of 8 out of 10. Slack called the book "an integral part of the rules", and he found the quick reference chart for clerics particularly worthwhile, which describe items such as what a cleric should wear, what his holy colors and animals are, when and where he should worship, and what he should sacrifice. Slack felt that the book provides an alternative to the approach of inventing one's own religions, "which I expect most AD&D DMs will employ".

Lawrence Schick, in his 1991 book Heroic Worlds, was critical of the format used for the original Deities and Demigods: "Unfortunately, the book is usually used merely as a sort of Monster Manual that describes very high-powered monsters. This usage is encouraged by the book's format, which emphasizes the gods' physical abilities over their religious significance." Schick calls the second edition of Legends & Lore for the 2nd edition rules "a vast improvement... with a much greater emphasis on mythology and the duties of each deity's priesthood".

In a retrospective review of Deities & Demigods in Black Gate, Nick Ozment said "One of the most fun, crazy, and controversial tomes to come out of Advanced Dungeons & Dragons was, without a doubt, Deities and Demigods (1980)."

3rd Edition
The reviewer from Pyramid commented on the art for the third edition Deities and Demigods, stating that the book "uses a broader mix of styles than earlier books; some art is done is a more abstract fashion that stands in stark contrast to the crisp look of the veteran Wizards of the Coast artists".

James Voelpel from mania.com commented: "The rulebook's mix of excellent artwork, rules and layout makes Deities and Demigods a real winner. Once again, it is a bit pricey for the average gamer at $29.95, but well worth it for the contents."

The third edition Deities and Demigods won the 2002 Ennie Award for "Best Art (Interior)".

Notes

References

Further reading
 "Tuatha de Danaan", Dragon #65.
 Reviews: Different Worlds #19 (1982); Legends & Lore was reviewed in White Wolf #27 (1991)

External links
 Deities & Demigods (first edition) from the Pen & Paper RPG Database
 Legends & Lore (second edition) from the Pen & Paper RPG Database
 Deities & Demigods / Legends & Lore from the Acaeum.com
 http://www.rpg.net/news+reviews/reviews/rev_7815.html
 http://www.rpg.net/reviews/archive/12/12867.phtml

1980 books
Classical mythology in popular culture
Dungeons & Dragons sourcebooks
ENnies winners
Norse mythology in popular culture
Role-playing game supplements introduced in 1980